Heavenly host ( sabaoth or tzva'ot, "armies") refers to the army of angels mentioned both in the Hebrew and Christian Bibles, as well as other Abrahamic texts.

The Bible gives several descriptions of angels in military terms, such as their encampment, command structure (Matt.13:41; Rev.7:2), and combat (Jdg.5:20; Job 19:12; Rev.12:7). In Christian theology, the heavenly host participate in the war in Heaven.

Biblical accounts

In the Hebrew Bible, the name Yahweh and the title Elohim (literally 'gods', usually rendered as 'God' in English translations) frequently occur with the word tzevaot or sabaoth ("hosts" or "armies", Hebrew: צבאות) as YHWH Elohe Tzevaot ("YHWH God of Hosts"), Elohe Tzevaot ("God of Hosts"), Adonai YHWH Tzevaot ("Lord YHWH of Hosts") or, most frequently, YHWH Tzevaot ("YHWH of Hosts"). This name is traditionally transliterated in Latin as Sabaoth, a form that will be more familiar to many English readers, as it is used in the King James Version of the Bible.

In  the Book of Joshua 5:13–15, Joshua encounters a "captain of the host of the Lord" in the early days of his campaigns in the Promised Land. This unnamed heavenly messenger is sent by God to encourage Joshua in the upcoming claiming of the Promised Land:

In the Book of Revelation, the rebellious forces of Satan are defeated by the heavenly host led by Michael the Archangel during the War in Heaven (Rev.12:7–9).

Quran 

The term junud referring to explicitdly to hosts of spirits. The opposite is junud Iblis (the invisible hosts of Satan). While the Quran portrays that angels have intervened during the Battle of Badr to fight against the devils and jinn (pagan deities),, Islamic theology and philosophy understands the battle of these two hosts to occur within human heart (Qalb) as within the texts of Ja'far ibn Sa'id and Al-Ghazali. Unlike Christianity, dualistic tendencies are usually minimized in Islamic tradition, and God is ultimately in control of both hosts; enabling a choice a side for the created beings.

Baháʼí Faith
The term "Lord of Hosts" is also used in the Baháʼí Faith as a title of God. Bahá'u'lláh, claiming to be the Manifestation of God, wrote tablets to many of the kings and rulers of the world inviting them to recognize him as the Promised One of all ages and faiths, some of which were compiled and published in English as The Summons of the Lord of Hosts.

In literature 
In the English epic poem Paradise Lost by John Milton, the Archangel Michael commands the army of angels loyal to God against the fallen angels of Satan. Armed with a sword from God's armory, he defeats Satan in personal combat, wounding his side.

See also
 Astrotheology
 Divine Council
 Hierarchy of angels
 List of angels in theology

References

External links

Angels in Christianity
Angels in Judaism
Angels in Islam
Biblical cosmology
Biblical phrases
Christian iconography
Christian terminology
Classes of angels
Heaven
Hebrew Bible words and phrases